Zacharias Johannes "Zach" de Beer (born Cape Town, South Africa, 11 October 1928 – 27 May 1999) was a liberal Afrikaner South African politician and businessman. He was the last leader of the liberal Progressive Federal Party and then the co-leader of the new liberal Democratic Party.

Educated at Bishop's Diocesan College in Rondebosch, He completed an MBChB degree at the University of Cape Town in 1951. There he was elected president of the Students Representative Council.

Political career 

De Beer was born in Woodstock, Cape Town, the son of Jean Isobel (MacRae) and Zacharias Johannes de Beer. He was first elected to the House of Assembly in 1953 as an MP for the opposition United Party. He was 24 years old at the time, and was the youngest MP ever elected to the parliament. On the party's left wing, he and fellow MPs including Helen Suzman, Colin Eglin, Ray Swart, Harry Lawrence and Dr Jan Steytler resigned from the party after its national congress voted against returning any further land to the black majority for their occupation and use. He and the other liberal MPs formed the new Progressive Party in 1959. Like all the Progressive MPs except Helen Suzman, De Beer lost his seat in the 1961 general election. He joined an advertising agency before moving on to work for the Anglo American PLC/De Beers diamond mining conglomerate.

In the 1977 general election, he was returned to Parliament as an MP for what had become the Progressive Federal Party which had been formed that year through a merger of the Progressive Party and various other liberal groups of MPs. He became the PFP's leader in August 1988 and, with Denis Worrall and Wynand Malan was a co-leader of the new Democratic Party when it formed in 1989.

Following the DP's defeat in the first post-apartheid election of 1994, De Beer resigned as party leader. He was appointed South African ambassador to the Netherlands by Nelson Mandela.

De Beer was for many years a director of Anglo American PLC/De Beers. He died of a stroke at his home in Clifton, Cape Town, in 1999.

References 

1928 births
1999 deaths
Afrikaner anti-apartheid activists
Ambassadors of South Africa to the Netherlands
White South African anti-apartheid activists
Democratic Party (South Africa) politicians
Members of the House of Assembly (South Africa)
Politicians from Cape Town
Progressive Federal Party politicians
United Party (South Africa) politicians
University of Cape Town alumni